"No Speech" is a 2000 song by German rock band Guano Apes. It was released their second single from their second album Don't Give Me Names on 24 July 2000. The music video shows the band performing inside a truck.

Track listing

CD single
No Speech - 3:29
Open Your Eyes (Live at Viva Overdrive Studios, 14 April 2000) - 3:19
No Speech (Live at Viva Overdrive Studios, 14 April 2000) - 3:50

CD single 2
No Speech - 3:29
Open Your Eyes (Live at Viva Overdrive Studios, 14 April 2000) - 3:19
Mine All Mine (Live at Viva Overdrive Studios, 14 April 2000) - 3:43
No Speech (Live at Viva Overdrive Studios, 14 April 2000) - 3:50

Promo single
No Speech - 3:29
Open Your Eyes (Live at Viva Overdrive Studios, 14 April 2000) - 3:19

Promo single 2
No Speech - 3:29
Mine All Mine - 3:48
Ain't Got Time - 2:42

Charts

References

2000 singles
Guano Apes songs
1999 songs